Andrzej Orzeszek (born 21 February 1967) is a retired Polish football midfielder.

References

1967 births
Living people
Polish footballers
Górnik Zabrze players
Szombierki Bytom players
Aluminium Konin players
Hutnik Nowa Huta players
Association football midfielders
Polish football managers
Zagłębie Sosnowiec managers